Estación Chillán,  is a railway station of the Empresa de los Ferrocarriles del Estado, located in Chillán, Chile. It is the main railway station in the Bío Bío Region. It is located on Brasil avenue.

Estación Chillán is part of the Red Sur EFE, the TerraSur inter-city service has its final stop here.

Previously the Red Sur EFE continued from here to the south; to the city of Temuco, but the passenger service was definitively closed in 2009.

The nearby Maria Teresa Bus Terminal is within walking distance from the Station.

Lines and trains 
The following lines and trains terminate at Estación Chillán:

Red Sur EFE
TerraSur inter-city service (Alameda - Estación Chillán)

Adjacent stations

External links 
 Empresa de los Ferrocarriles del Estado
 Terrasur

Chillan
Buildings and structures in Biobío Region